The Bells is a 1931 British drama film directed by Harcourt Templeman and Oscar Werndorff and starring Donald Calthrop, Jane Welsh, and Edward Sinclair.

The film was originally released with the only film score written by Gustav Holst. It was based on the play Le Juif Polonais by Alexandre Chatrian and Emile Erckmann, and the English version, The Bells by Leopold Lewis.

Plot

Mathias, an Alsatian innkeeper, murders a rich Pole staying at his inn. His conscience will not let him rest, and the Pole's spirit drives him nearly mad.

The victim's brother calls for an inquest and brings a sideshow hypnotist, who is supposed to read minds. Mathias, as burgomaster, is called upon to conduct the inquest but, under the intuitive eye of the hypnotist, cannot endure the torment of his own conscience.

Cast
Donald Calthrop as Mathias 
Jane Welsh as Annette 
Edward Sinclair as Sergeant Christian Nash 
O. B. Clarence as Watchman 
Wilfred Shine as Philosopher 
Ralph Truman as Blacksmith
Anita Sharp-Bolster

Loss
The Bells is now considered a lost film. In 1974, Imogen Holst wrote that its score is also lost.

See also
List of lost films
BFI 75 Most Wanted
The Bells (Australia 1911)
The Bells (US 1918)
The Bells (US 1926)
The Burgomeister (Australia 1935)

References

Bibliography
Bergfelder, Tim & Cargnelli, Christian, Destination London: German-speaking Emigrés and British Cinema, 1925-1950 (Berghahn Books, 2008)

External links

1931 films
1931 drama films
British drama films
British films based on plays
Lost British films
British black-and-white films
1931 lost films
1930s British films